The Honeoye Central School District is a public school district in New York State that serves 619 students in  in the hamlet of Honeoye and the town of Richmond in Ontario County with a staff of 227 (140 instructional personnel and 87 support staff).

The average class size is 17 students (all grades). With each graduating class having an average of 45 students (Lowest level has 32, highest grade level is 58)  The student-teacher ratio is 10:1.

References

External links
 
 New York State School Boards Association

School districts in New York (state)
Education in Ontario County, New York